Zebrina  is a genus of air-breathing land snails, terrestrial pulmonate gastropod mollusks in the family Enidae.

Species 
Species in the genus Zebrina include:
 Zebrina detrita (O. F. Müller, 1774)
 Zebrina fasciolata (Olivier, 1801) - type species for genus Zebrina
 Zebrina spratti (L. Pfeiffer, 1846)
 Zebrina varnensis (L. Pfeiffer, 1847)
Species brought into synonymy
 Zebrina kindermanni (L. Pfeiffer, 1853) : synonym of Leucomastus kindermanni (L. Pfeiffer, 1854)

References

 Bank, R. (2017). Classification of the Recent terrestrial Gastropoda of the World. Last update: July 16th, 2017

Enidae